Alexi Zentner (born August 29, 1973 in Kitchener, Ontario) is a Canadian-American short story writer, and novelist.

Life
He graduated from Grinnell College with a BA and Cornell University with an MFA.
He taught at Cornell University. He's now on the faculty at Binghamton University.

His fiction has also appeared in The Atlantic Monthly, Narrative Magazine (where it was awarded the 2008 Narrative Prize).

He lives in Ithaca, New York, with his wife and two children.

Awards
His short story "Touch," originally published in Tin House is featured in The O. Henry Prize Stories 2008 where it was chosen as a jury favorite by author Chimamanda Ngozi Adichie. Two of Alexi's short stories were also selected for "special mention" in the 2008 Pushcart Prize anthology. 
"Trapline" was awarded the 2008 Narrative Prize.

His debut novel Touch was a longlisted nominee for the 2011 Scotiabank Giller Prize.

Works

Novels
 Copperhead (novel) (Penguin Random House, 2019) 
The Lobster Kings (W. W. Norton & Company, 2014)
Touch (W. W. Norton & Company, 2011)

Short fiction
"Touch", 2008
"Trapline", Narrative Magazine, Fall 2008
"Furlough", The Atlantic, August 2009

Anthologies

Zentner also writes mysteries and horror novels under the pen name Ezekiel Boone.

References

External links
Alexi Zentner

Living people
Cornell University alumni
21st-century American novelists
Canadian male short story writers
Writers from Kitchener, Ontario
American male novelists
Canadian male novelists
21st-century Canadian novelists
American male short story writers
21st-century Canadian short story writers
21st-century American short story writers
21st-century Canadian male writers
1973 births
21st-century American male writers
O. Henry Award winners